Assistant Secretary of the Treasury was an office in the United States Department of the Treasury from 1849 until 1961 when it was replaced by the United States Assistant Secretary of the Treasury, one of several positions serving under the United States Secretary of the Treasury.

History
The office of Assistant Secretary of the Treasury was created by Act of March 3, 1849. An Act of March 14, 1864 provided for an additional Assistant Secretary, as did an Act of July 11, 1890. An act of October 6, 1917 provided for two additional Assistant Secretaries for duration of the Great War and six months after. An Act of July 22, 1954 also provided for an additional Assistant Secretary.

Former Assistant Secretaries of the Treasury

References
Notes

Sources

List of Assistant Secretaries
List of